The Eurovision Young Dancers 2015 was the fourteenth edition of the Eurovision Young Dancers competition. The final was held in the New Theatre in Plzeň, Czech Republic on 19 June 2015. This was the first time that the Czech national broadcaster, Česká televize (ČT), had organised a Eurovision event. The event is aimed at young dancers aged between 16 and 21, competing in modern dances, be it solo or in couples, as long as they were not professionally engaged.

Viktoria Nowak of  won the contest, with Staša Tušar of  placing second (runner-up).

Location

On 24 April 2014, the Czech city of Plzeň, was selected as the host city for the 2015 edition of the biennial Eurovision Young Dancers. The reasons behind this decision was to coincide the Young Dancers event alongside the European Capital of Culture, of which the city were organisers of a series of cultural events with a strong European dimension.

In November 2014, it was announced that the host broadcaster for the Czech Republic, Česká televize (ČT), had selected the New Theatre as the venue for the contest. The building first opened on 1 September 2014, showcasing a performance of Bedřich Smetana's The Bartered Bride, and has "state of the art" technology for a theatre of its kind. The 2015 Eurovision Young Dancers took place on 19 June 2015.

Format
The format consisted of dancers who were non-professional and between the ages of 16–21, competing in a performance of dance routines of their choice, which they had prepared in advance of the competition. All of the acts then took part in a choreographed group dance during 'Young Dancers Week'.

Presenters
On 10 March 2015, host broadcaster ČT, announced that  had been chosen to host the 2015 edition. Bouček, who is a well-known television presenter, speaks fluent Czech and English, and has experience with hosting live events, with his most recent being the 2014 European Athletics Championships. Česká televize, stated that his repertoire is why they decided to choose him to host the contest. Cameron McMillan, head choreographer and 2013 jury panel member, presented the backstage segments during the show.

Jury panel
Jury members of a professional aspect and representing the elements of ballet, contemporary, and modern dancing styles, score each of the competing individual and group dance routines. Once all the jury votes had been counted, the two participants which received the highest total of points progress to a final round. The final round consisted of a 90-second 'dual', where each of the finalists performed a 45-second random dance-off routine. The overall winner upon completion of the final dances was chosen by the professional jury members. The jury members were as follows:

  – 
  – 
  – Zenaida Yanowsky (winner of the Eurovision Young Dancers 1993)

Participating countries
The contest was limited to a maximum of fourteen countries, however, only ten countries confirmed their participation. Of the ten countries participating,   and  made their début;  returned after last competing at the Eurovision Young Dancers 1997.

Final duel

Broadcasting
The following countries, listed in order of broadcasting dates, confirmed that they would broadcast the contest.

Other countries
For a country to be eligible for potential participation in the Eurovision Young Dancers, it must be member of the European Broadcasting Union (EBU). The EBU issued an invitation of participation for the 2015 Contest to all 56 active members. Ten countries confirmed their participation, whilst the following countries declined, stating their reasons as shown below.

Members 
  – On 30 January 2015, the Armenian broadcaster Public Television of Armenia (ARMTV) announced that they would withdraw from the competition. Armenia last competed at the Eurovision Young Dancers 2013 event.
  – On 26 February 2015, the Belarusian broadcaster Belarusian Television and Radio Company (BTRC) announced that they would withdraw from the event, after last competing at the 2013 event.
  – The Flemish broadcaster Vlaamse Radio- en Televisieomroeporganisatie (VRT) announced on 3 December 2014 that they had no plans to return in 2015. Belgium last took part in 2005, although they had broadcast the 2013 event.
  – The Croatian broadcaster Croatian Radiotelevision (HRT), who last participated at the Eurovision Young Dancers 2011, announced on 30 January 2015 that they would not take part in the 2015 event.
  – The Cypriot broadcaster Cyprus Broadcasting Corporation (CyBC) announced on 5 December 2014 that a decision on participation had yet to be taken, making a return to the 2015 event possible. The island country, who last participated at the Eurovision Young Dancers 2005, did not make their return in the end.
  – The Finnish broadcaster Yleisradio (Yle) announced on 10 December 2014 that they were unable to take part in the 2015 event. Finland last took part in 2005.
  – On 28 November 2014, the Irish broadcaster Raidió Teilifís Éireann (RTÉ) announced that they had no plans to return to the event in 2015, after last taking part in 2001.
  – On 5 March 2015, the Latvian broadcaster Latvijas Televīzija (LTV) announced that they would not take part in the 2015 event. Latvia last participated at the 2005 Young Dancers event.
  – On 19 February 2015 it was confirmed that the Ukrainian broadcaster National Television Company of Ukraine (NTU), who last took part at the 2013 Eurovision Young Dancers, hadn't made any decisions on participating in the Junior Eurovision Song Contest 2015 and Eurovision Young Dancers 2015 due to their current financial and political situations and their focus on the creation of a public service broadcaster.
  – On 2 October 2014 the British Broadcasting Corporation (BBC) announced that they were to launch a new dancing competition in 2015 entitled "BBC Young Dancer", and it was thought that the winner would represent the United Kingdom, marking a potential return to Eurovision Young Dancers, since their last participation in 2005. On 7 October 2014, the BBC replied to a post on the show's Facebook page saying there were "no plans at present" to return in 2015.

See also 
 European Capital of Culture
 Eurovision Song Contest 2015
 Eurovision Young Dancers
 Junior Eurovision Song Contest 2015

References

External links 
 
 Plzeň 2015 (European Capital of Culture)

Eurovision Young Dancers by year
2015 in the Czech Republic
June 2015 events in Europe
Entertainment events in the Czech Republic